Imdad is a given name. Notable people with the name include: Imdad Hussain (1993)

Allama Imdad Ali Imam Ali Kazi (1886–1968), scholar, philosopher, jurist, and educationist
Imdad Hussaini (born 1940), prolific Sindhi poet and writer of Pakistan
Imdad Khan (1848–1920), sitar and surbahar player
Imdad Imam Asar, (1849–1933), Indian Writer and Critic.